"Can't Be Friends" is an R&B song by American recording artist Trey Songz. It was officially sent to U.S. urban radio on September 28, 2010 as the second single of Songz' fourth studio album, Passion, Pain & Pleasure. The song is produced by Mario Winans and written by Winans and Songz.

Lyrically, Trey Songz explains a bad breakup between him and his girlfriend and how they cannot be just friends after he fell in love with her.

The music is sampled from a piece known as "Bibo no aozora" composed by Ryuichi Sakamoto, released in 1996, which is also used in the 2006 film Babel.

Music video
The official music video for this song was released on September 7, 2010. It is highly compared to Usher's "Confessions Part II" and "Trading Places" video, due to the very similar concept.  It shows Trey on a chair, in a dark background, singing. As the song continues on, a girl makes her appearance and Trey goes shirtless. The official remix will have Keri Hilson but will be on Trey songz mixtape Ready: The finale

Charts
On the week ending October 2, 2010, "Can't Be Friends" debuted at #74 on the Billboard Hot 100 and currently peaked at #43.
The song spent 13 consecutive weeks at number one on the Billboard Hot R&B/Hip-Hop Songs chart.

Weekly charts

Year-end charts

Decade-end charts

Certifications

See also
List of number-one R&B singles of 2010 (U.S.)
List of number-one R&B singles of 2011 (U.S.)

References

2010 singles
Trey Songz songs
Contemporary R&B ballads
Music videos directed by Anthony Mandler
Songs written by Mario Winans
2010 songs
Songs written by Trey Songz